The Rockhal is a concert hall in Esch-sur-Alzette, in southern Luxembourg. It opened on 23 September 2005, has a maximum capacity of 6,500 people and is sited on the former industrial site of Belval in the west of Esch.

Building 
The Rockhal consists of 4 different parts:
 The Main hall with a maximum capacity of 6,500 standing places or 2,800 seats on an area of 2625 m2
 The club, the small venue at the Rockhal, with a maximum capacity of 1,100 standing places on an area of 560 m2 
 The “Rockhalcafé”, a bar and restaurant, which also hosts smaller shows
 The Music & Resources Centre with six rehearsal rooms, a recording studio, a dance studio and a documentation centre.

Entertainment 
Since its opening, Rockhal has been one of the top entertainment venues in the country, with many international and regional artists having performed at the venue spanning a wide range of music genres. A list of concerts held at the venue are listed in the table below; non-concert entertainment events are also included.

References

External links

Concert halls in Luxembourg
Music venues in Luxembourg
Buildings and structures in Esch-sur-Alzette